Martin Paul Glancy (born 24 March 1976) is a Scottish former footballer who played for Dumbarton, Inverness Caledonian Thistle, Clydebank, Berwick Rangers, Queen of the South, Stranraer, Airdrie United and Stirling Albion.

References

1976 births
Scottish footballers
Dumbarton F.C. players
Inverness Caledonian Thistle F.C. players
Clydebank F.C. (1965) players
Berwick Rangers F.C. players
Queen of the South F.C. players
Stranraer F.C. players
Airdrieonians F.C. players
Stirling Albion F.C. players
Bathgate Thistle F.C. players
Scottish Football League players
Living people
Association football forwards